African lily is a common name for several plants and may refer to:

Agapanthus africanus, native of the Cape of Good Hope in South Africa. 
Agapanthus praecox, also native to the Cape of Good Hope, and Natal Province in South Africa.

References